"Gimme Shelter" is a song by The Rolling Stones.

Gimme Shelter may also refer to:
 Gimme Shelter (album), by The Rolling Stones
 Gimme Shelter (1970 film), documentary about The Rolling Stones by the Maysles brothers
 Gimme Shelter (2013 film), drama directed by Ron Krauss
  Gimme Shelter (Law & Order), three-part crossover event of Law & Order TV series